Maring may refer to:

Maring people, a tribe of Manipur, northeast India
Tsembaga Maring tribe, a tribe in Papua New Guinea
pseudonym of Henk Sneevliet

See also
Maeringas, an Ostrogothic tribe; see Rök runestone